Niphaea is a genus of flowering plants belonging to the family Gesneriaceae.

Its native range is Mexico to Guatemala.

Species:

Niphaea mexicana 
Niphaea oblonga 
Niphaea pumila

References

Gesnerioideae
Gesneriaceae genera